Dictyosphaeria cavernosa is a species of green algae (class Ulvophyceae) in the family Siphonocladaceae, one of the three species in this family.

Description 
Dictyospharea cavernosa is multicelluar with multiple bumps or bubbles on the surface. Dictyosphaeria cavernosa is hollow in contrast to its sister species D. versluysii of the same appearance which is solid.

Habitat 
Dictyosphaeria cavernosa is usually found in the crevices of rock formations around rocky tidal pools. It may look like a green rock at first, but it is a Dictyosphaeria cavernosa.

References

Siphonocladaceae
Plants described in 1932